V. lutea may refer to:

 Vicia lutea, an annual herb
 Vigna lutea, a creeping vine
 Vinca lutea, a North American vine
 Viola lutea, a European violet